Lacunoides exquisitus is a species of sea snail, a marine gastropod mollusk in the family Neomphalidae.

Description
The length of the shell attains 2.24 mm.

Distribution
This marine species occurs off the Galapagos Islands at a depth of 2480 m.

References

Zoologica Scripta 18(1): 67–102

Neomphalidae
Gastropods described in 1989